Jean Claes can refer to:

 Jean Claes (footballer, born 1902)
 Jean Claes (footballer, born 1934)
 Jean-Baptiste Claes, Belgian racing cyclist